Roel Boomstra (born 9 March 1993) is a Dutch draughts player and current world champion. He won the Draughts World Championship match in 2016, 2018 and 2022. In 2014 Boomstra won the Draughts European Championship. He also won the Dutch championship twice (2012, 2015). Boomstra holds the title of International Grandmaster. He was born in Utrecht.

World championship
 2011 (7th place)
 2013 (3rd place)
 2015 (3rd place)
 2016 (winner)
 2017 (semifinal group C 5th-6th place)
 2018 (winner)
 2021 (3rd place)
 2022 (winner)

Boomstra did not participate in the 2019 World Draughts Championship, because he decided to focus on his studies in physics.

European championship
 2006 (63rd place)
 2010 (8th place)
 2012 (12th place)
 2014 (1 place)
 2016 (2 place)

Netherlands championship
 2009 (3rd place)
 2010 (2nd place)
 2011 (2nd place)
 2012 (1st place)
 2013 (5th place)
 2014 (2nd place)
 2015 (1st place)
 2018 (2nd place)

References

External links
Roel Boomstra profile at KNDB
Roel Boomstra profile at FMJD

1993 births
Living people
Dutch draughts players
Players of international draughts
Sportspeople from Utrecht (city)
21st-century Dutch people